Goodie or Goody bag may refer to:

 Promotional merchandise
 Party favor
 Goody Bag (Kim Heechul & Kim Jungmo EP), 2016
 Goody Bag (Netta EP), 2020
 "Goody Bag", a song by Still Woozy